The Musical (Summary Proceedings) Copyright Act 1902 (2 Edw. VII c. 15) was an Act of Parliament of the Parliament of the United Kingdom, given the royal assent on 22 July 1902, in force from 1 October 1902, and repealed in 1956.

It provided that the owner of the copyright in a musical work could apply to a court of summary jurisdiction with evidence that unlicensed copies of the work were being "hawked, carried about, sold or offered for sale", and that the court could order a constable to seize these copies without warrant and bring them before the court. If it was proven the copies were unauthorized, the court could order them to be destroyed, or delivered to the copyright owner.

It also empowered any constable, on the written request (and risk) of the copyright owner or his or her designated agent, to seize without warrant any infringing copy being hawked for sale and bring them before a court; on the proof that they were copyright infringements, they could then be disposed of by the court as above.

In the context of this act, "musical work" meant a melody or harmony "printed, reduced to writing, or otherwise graphically produced or reproduced". Recorded music was not envisaged in the scope of the legislation.

The Act was repealed by the Copyright Act 1956.

References
The Public General Acts Passed in the Second Year of the Reign of His Majesty King Edward the Seventh. London: printed for His Majesty's Stationery Office. 1902.
Chronological table of the statutes; HMSO, London. 1993.

United Kingdom Acts of Parliament 1902
United Kingdom copyright law
Copyright legislation
1902 in music
1900s in British music